Little Egypt was an African-American community in Texas founded after the Civil War and continuing until the sale of the land in 1962. The neighborhood was located within Dallas city limits, north of Northwest Highway. It was about thirty-five acres in size. The land currently has large homes and the Northlake Shopping Center. Students from Richland College have been working on a project to discover what happened to the families after they left Little Egypt. Professors, Clive Siegle and Tim Sullivan of Richland, are conducting an archeological survey of the footprints of two of the Little Egypt houses on an empty lot in the area. Siegle has found a few artifacts on the site. Siegle would like to document oral history from those who once lived in the town.

History 
The land was originally given to newly freed slaves after the end of the Civil War. Jeff and Hanna Hill, the slaves receiving the land, were freed by their masters in 1865. The Little Egypt Baptist Church was built in 1870. The name was chosen to allude to the Biblical story of the Exodus of Jews, who were slaves, from Egypt. The town only had one school for all grade levels. Early on, people in the community farmed as sharecroppers or worked on nearby plantations. The McCree Cemetery served the residents of Little Egypt.

Over time, the area became surrounded by a wealthy white neighborhood. In November 1961, Little Egypt was rezoned for retail use.

In 1962, the residents sold their homes for cash to a group that wanted to build a shopping center on the land. The organization that paid for the land also paid for the residents' moving costs. Residents were advised by a trustee of the Little Egypt Baptist Church, Sarah Robinson, to sell their homes in order to get a better deal. The real estate deal took a year to finalize. Residents' homes in Little Egypt did not have water or sewer connections and the church had no central heating or restrooms. The streets were unpaved. More than 200 people moved in 1962, all in one day. Residents either moved to the nearby Cedar Crest neighborhood in Dallas, to Oak Cliff or into Rockwall County. Many residents apparently left eagerly because they were able to purchase modern homes with the money given them by the development group.

References

External links 
 News Script: Little Egypt (WBAP-TV)

Unincorporated communities in Dallas County, Texas
Neighborhoods in Dallas
1865 establishments in Texas
1962 disestablishments in Texas
Populated places established in 1865
Populated places disestablished in 1962
Cultural history of the American Civil War
Unincorporated communities in Texas
Populated places in Texas established by African Americans